The Book about Milutin (Serbian: Knjiga o Milutinu, Књига о Милутину) is a novel by the Serbian writer Danko Popović. Novel is about Milutin, Serbian peasant and former soldier who tells his story from jail after World War II. He talks to imaginary listener about tragic fate of Serbian people, his family and Serbia. Published in 1985.

Content
Milutin Ostojić, a Serbian peasant and a martyr from some Šumadija village was a real person. The book shows a true face of village and peasant, it discovers a source of true moral sensitivity in a peasant and martyr (Milutin), his sense for justice, his spirit which follows an original approach to life. Milutin's spirit shows that a life that follows strong sense of human dignity is not an invention of moralists.

Milutin is a Šumadijan farmer, a World War I Thesalloniki Front infantry soldier. His father was killed in Serbo-Bulgarian War, his two brothers died in the Balkan Wars. As a war hero he returns home in order to experience maltreatment of him by the tax men of the state he defended and participated in her creation. In the war and after it, he learned what a human not obeying to the law and the customs could and dare to do. Fighting for his country and her freedom in his youth, Milutin was not able to predict what he might expect in his old age. His son, at a teenager age, was recruited and sent on Srem Front in 1944. Milutin protested by offering himself as a replacement for his son. Asked why young men, still children, inexperienced in the war fights, should be sent in war. The consolation he offered to himself (It's not just about his son, there are many other sons recruited and sent into the war, too) was ridiculed by his wife Zivana, "Is it easier to bear a misfortune if the misfortune is far greater?". The news about their only son's death, Milutin and Zivana met petrified. Old warrior Milutin, after the World War II, was arrested innocent in the time of the "grain redemption", thrown into a jail to be maltreated by a gang of criminals and nobodies there.

Perception of the book by historians
Historian J. Dragović-Soso wrote Milutin's common sense and his naivete provide the vehicle through which the main events of the first half of the 20eth century are apprehended, and his commentary on the creation of the common Yugoslav state, the corruption and disunity of that state, the resurgence of war in 1941 and the immorality of the new communist authorities, illuminates the absurdity of the struggle and sacrifices of the Serbian people. Milutin noticed that the Slav brothers did not rise up, they did not experience the same as us, they lived and cooperated with Serbian enemies, and look upon their 'liberators' Serbs with a haughty disdain.
While Dragović-Soso is willing to represent the Serbs' doubts in their unity with Slav brothers and the meaning of that brotherhood, the price they paid and they are paying for that unity and brotherhood without her opinion about the same, the others are willing to interpret the Serbs existential questions little more than a pretext on which to string a litany of complaints and questions, most of which have to do with Serbia's alleged tendencies to sacrifice its own interest for the sake of others.

References

Sources
Knjiga o Milutinu - trebnik etičnosti by Miroslav Eregić chapter in Knjiga o Milutinu by Danko Popović, L'age d'home Belgrade 2000

1985 novels
Serbian novels
Novels set in Serbia